Fort McPherson Water Aerodrome  was located adjacent to Fort McPherson, Northwest Territories, Canada on the Peel River. The airport was listed as abandoned in the 15 March 2007 Canada Flight Supplement.

See also
Fort McPherson Airport

References

Airports in the Arctic
Defunct seaplane bases in the Northwest Territories